In policing on the Indian subcontinent, a chargesheet is prepared after first information reports (FIRs), and charges an individual for (some or all of) the crimes specified in those reports. 

Once the chargesheet has been submitted to a court of law, the court decides as to who among the accused has sufficient prima facie evidence against them to be put on trial. After the court pronounces its order on framing of charges, prosecution proceedings against the accused begin in the judicial system.

References

Law enforcement in India
Law enforcement in Pakistan
Law enforcement in Bangladesh